Bajar dengan Djiwa (Perfected Spelling: Bayar dengan Jiwa; Indonesian for "Pay with [One's] Soul") is a believed lost 1941 film from the Dutch East Indies (modern day Indonesia). Directed by R Hu and produced by Ang Hock Liem, it starred A Bakar, Djoewariah, O Parma, Oedjang, RS Fatimah, Soelastri, and Zonder. The story centers on two families torn apart by finances and clashes of personality.

The third film produced by Union Films, Bajar dengan Djiwa featured many actors who had previously appeared in the company's works. It was released by February 1941. Advertisements emphasised the realism of the story, and reviewers praised the film's acting, romance, and humour. Screenings continued until at least 1943, more than a year after Union was closed following the Japanese occupation.

Plot 
Bajar dengan Djiwa follows the interactions of several groups of people. Husband and wife Basuki (Zonder) and Suryati (Nji Soelastri) clash because of their different personalities: the former is a thinker concerned with the state of society, while the latter only thinks of herself. Meanwhile, Umar (Oedjang) and Supini (RS Fatimah) clash over Umar's wasteful nature; eventually, he sinks so far into debt that he must sell his daughter, Djuliah (Djoewariah), to a loan shark named Asnan (O. Parma), a move which breaks the heart of Djuliah's boyfriend Ruhiyat (A Bakar). Other scenes include comic interactions between two servants, Icah (Ijem) and Djemblug (Komung).

Production 
Bajar dengan Djiwa was directed by R Hu for Union Films. It was Hu's second film for the company; he had already completed one film for the company, Harta Berdarah (Bloody Treasure; 1941), in collaboration with Rd Ariffien. The film, Union's third, was produced by its head, Ang Hock Liem. The story was written by journalist Saeroen, who had joined Union with Harta Berdarah after previously finding success with Tan's Film.

This black-and-white film starred A Bakar, Djoewariah, O Parma, Oedjang, RS Fatimah, Soelastri, and Zonder. It also included Itjang Ali, Haroen, Oesman, Komoeng, Ijem, and Moesa. Many of these actors, including Soelastri and Fatimah, had been with Union since its first production, Kedok Ketawa (The Laughing Mask), in 1940. Others, including Moesa and Zonder, had made their debuts in Harta Berdarah. Djoewariah, a stage actress and keroncong singer, was a new hire.

Release and reception 
Bajar dengan Djiwa, produced in 1940, was released by February 1941. By July 1941 the film was being screened in Singapore, then part of British Malaya. A novelisation of the film, written by Saeroen, was published by the Yogyakarta-based Kolff-Buning. In the East Indies, children under age 17 were prohibited from viewing. Advertisements, some which referred to the film with the Dutch title Met den Dood Betaald, emphasised the film's "realistic" depiction of a married life.

A review in the Java Bode found that Bajar dengan Djiwa was one of the Best Malay films yet made, with "almost no stiffness and woodenness" in the acting. Another review, in the Nieuws van den Dag voor Nederlandsch-Indië, described the film as "striking proof" of Saeroen's knowledge of indigenous society and praised the film's romance and humour.

Legacy 
After Bajar Dengan Djiwa, Union produced a further five films; all but one were directed by Hu or Ariffien. Saeroen wrote two of them, leaving for Star Film following Wanita dan Satria (1941). Much of the cast remained with Union for several productions. The company's subsequent production, Asmara Moerni (1941), for instance, had Djoewariah in the leading role, alongside a new hire (the doctor Adnan Kapau Gani). Union Films was ultimately dissolved following the Japanese occupation of the Dutch East Indies in March 1942. In 2011 Ade Irwansyah of Tabloid Bintang listed the poster for Bajar Dengan Djiwa as one of the best Indonesian film posters of all time.

Bajar Dengan Djiwa was screened as late as October 1943, but is now probably lost. In common with the rest of the world at the time, movies in the Indies were shot on highly flammable nitrate film, and after a fire destroyed much of Produksi Film Negara's warehouse in 1952, old Indies films shot on nitrate were deliberately destroyed. As such, American visual anthropologist Karl G. Heider suggests that all Indonesian films from before 1950 are lost. However, JB Kristanto's Katalog Film Indonesia (Indonesian Film Catalogue) records several as having survived at Sinematek Indonesia's archives, and the film historian Misbach Yusa Biran writes that some Japanese propaganda films can be found at the Netherlands Government Information Service.

Explanatory notes

References

Works cited 

 
 
 
 
 
 
 
 
 
 
 
 
 
  (book acquired from the collection of Museum Tamansiswa Dewantara Kirti Griya, Yogyakarta)

External links 
 

Indonesian black-and-white films
1941 films
Union Films films
Lost Indonesian films
Indonesian drama films
1941 drama films
1941 lost films
Lost drama films